Stanley Wilson may refer to:
Stanley C. Wilson (1879–1967), American politician
Stanley Herbert Wilson (1899–1953), British composer
Stanley Wilson (cricketer) (born 1948), Australian cricketer
Stanley Wilson (musician) (1917–1970), American musician and composer
Stanley Wilson (running back) (born 1961), American football running back
Stanley Wilson Jr. (1982–2023), American football cornerback

See also
Stan Wilson (disambiguation)